Sven Knudsen (22 February 1892 – 8 March 1968) was a Danish footballer. He played in eight matches for the Denmark national football team from 1913 to 1916.

References

External links
 

1892 births
1968 deaths
Danish men's footballers
Denmark international footballers
Place of birth missing
Association footballers not categorized by position